Bahuara is a Gram Panchayat in Hajipur,  Vaishali district, Bihar.

Geography
This panchayat is located at

panchayat office
panchayat bhawan bahuara (पंचायत भवन bahuara )

Nearest City/Town
Parsathua (Distance 4 km)

Nearest major road highway or river
NH 103 (National highway 103)( nearest state highway )
railway line
And 
Other roadway

compass

Villages in panchayat
There are  villages in this panchayat

 Randaha
 Shivganj
 Bahuara

References

Villages in Vaishali district
Vaishali district
Hajipur
Gram panchayats in Bihar